Laura McClelland (born 7 March 2001) is an Australian rules footballer playing for the Richmond Football Club in the AFL Women's (AFLW). McClelland was drafted by Richmond with their second selection and twenty-fifth overall in the 2019 AFL Women's draft. She made her debut against  at Ikon Park in the opening round of the 2020 season.

Statistics
Statistics are correct to round 3, 2022

|- style="background-color: #eaeaea"
! scope="row" style="text-align:center" | 2020
|style="text-align:center;"|
| 16 || 5 || 1 || 1 || 13 || 17 || 30 || 6 || 13 || 0.2 || 0.2 || 2.6 || 3.4 || 6.0 || 1.2 || 2.6
|- 
| scope="row" style="text-align:center" | 2021
|style="text-align:center;"|
| 16 || 3 || 0 || 0 || 17 || 6 || 23 || 3 || 3 || 0.0 || 0.0 || 5.7 || 2.0 || 7.7 || 1.0 || 1.0
|- style="background:#EAEAEA"
| scope="row" text-align:center | 2022
| 
| 16 || 2 || 0 || 0 || 2 || 10 || 12 || 1 || 1 || 0.0 || 0.0 || 1.0 || 5.0 || 6.0 || 0.5 || 0.5
|-
|- class="sortbottom"
! colspan=3| Career
! 10
! 1
! 1
! 32
! 33
! 65
! 10
! 17
! 0.1
! 0.1
! 3.2
! 3.3
! 6.5
! 1.0
! 1.7
|}

References

External links

  
 

2001 births
Living people
Richmond Football Club (AFLW) players
Eastern Ranges players (NAB League Girls)
Australian rules footballers from Victoria (Australia)